Oswego may refer to:

Places

United States 
Oswego, Illinois, a village in Kendall County
Oswego, Indiana, an unincorporated place in Kosciusko County
Oswego, Kansas, a city in Labette County
Oswego, Mississippi, an unincorporated community
Oswego, Montana, a village in Valley County
Oswego River (New Jersey), a tributary of the Wading River
Oswego, South Carolina, a census-designated place in Sumter County
Lake Oswego, Oregon, a city in northwest Oregon
Oswego Lake, a lake in Lake Oswego, Oregon
In New York:
Oswego, New York, a city in Oswego County
State University of New York at Oswego, a public university
Fort Oswego, which occupied the same site
Oswego County, New York
Oswego River (New York), a tributary of Lake Ontario
Oswego (town), New York, a town in Oswego County

Other uses
Monarda didyma (Oswego Tea), a flower and an herb, native to North America

See also
Owego (disambiguation)